Epidendrum rondoniense  is an epiphytic species of orchid of the genus Epidendrum, occurring in Brazil.

References

External links 

rondoniense
Orchids of Brazil
Epiphytic orchids